Bogd is a Mongolian word meaning "saint, holy, sacred" and also a place name which may refer to
Bogd, Bayankhongor,a sum (district) of Bayankhongor Province
Bogd, Övörkhangai, a sum (district) of Övörkhangai Province
Bogd Khan, title of the eighth Jebtsundamba Khutughtu after Mongolia' declaration of independence in 1911
Bogd Khan Mountain, a mountain in central Mongolia 
Aj Bogd, a mountain in the Altai mountains range 
Ikh Bogd, a mountain in the Altai mountains range 
Shiliin Bogd, an extinct volcano in eastern Mongolia